Wilfried Bode (13 December 1929 – 25 September 2012) was a German water polo player. He competed at the 1952 Summer Olympics and the 1956 Summer Olympics.

References

1929 births
2012 deaths
German male water polo players
Olympic water polo players of Germany
Olympic water polo players of the United Team of Germany
Water polo players at the 1952 Summer Olympics
Water polo players at the 1956 Summer Olympics
Sportspeople from Hanover